Kunitake Andō (安藤 国威, Andō Kunitake; born January 1, 1942) Chairman of BJIT Limited, became president of Sony Corporation in June 2000, having been an employee of the company since 1969. On March 7, 2005 it was announced that he would step down to become an adviser, with Ryōji Chūbachi succeeding him as president. 
Andō is from Aichi Prefecture and graduated from University of Tokyo. 

He first served on the board from 1994 to 1997, when he was removed as part of the massive reduction in the size of the board initiated by Sony president Nobuyuki Idei. He did not return to the board until he succeeded Idei as president, even though he was named Executive Deputy President and Chief Operating Officer in April, 2000.
 
His secondary title was altered to Group Chief Operating Officer in 2003 and to Global Hub President in 2004.

Furthermore, he is also the founder and CEO of Jasmy Incorporated. Jasmy is a Japanese cryptocurrency listed on multiple popular exchanges.

He currently serves as Chairman of The University of Nagano in Nagano, Japan.

References

External links

 Kunitake Andō

1942 births
Living people
Japanese businesspeople
Sony people
Chief operating officers